ArenaBowl '93 (or ArenaBowl VII) was the Arena Football League's seventh Arena Bowl. The game featured the number 3 Tampa Bay Storm (9–3) of the National Conference against the number 1 Detroit Drive (11–1) of the American Conference. The Storm defeated the Drive by the score of 51–31, winning their second ArenaBowl in team history, and their second one in three years.

Game summary
In the first quarter, the Storm struck first with kicker Arden Czyzewski getting a 24-yard field goal, while quarterback Jay Gruden completed a 15-yard touchdown pass to WR-LB Stevie Thomas.

In the second quarter, Detroit got on the board with kicker John Langeloh getting a 21-yard field goal, yet the Storm answered with Czyzewski nailing a 47-yard field goal and OL-DL Keith Browner recovering a Drive fumble in their end zone for a touchdown. Detroit answered with QB Gilbert Renfoe completing a 27-yard touchdown pass to OS George LaFrance, yet Tampa Bay replied with Gruden completing an 18-yard touchdown pass to WR-DB Amod Field. The Drive got another touchdown as Renfoe completed a two-yard pass to OL-DL James Goode, while the Storm wrapped up the half with Czyzewski kicking a 26-yard field goal.

In the third quarter, with Tampa Bay in command, back-up QB Bobby Byrd got a touchdown pass in as he completed a nine-yard strike to Browner, while Detroit answered with Renfoe completing a 34-yard touchdown pass to WR/DB Grantis Bell.

In the fourth quarter, the Storm continued on its lead with Gruden completing a seven-yard touchdown pass to WR/LB "Downtown" Eddie Brown. All that was left of the Drive's comeback hopes was FB/LB Tony Burse getting a one-yard touchdown run. Tampa Bay wrapped up the game with FB/LB Les Barley getting a four-yard touchdown run.

With the win, the Storm got its second ArenaBowl title in three seasons.

Scoring summary
1st quarter
 TB - FG Czyzewski 24
 TB - Thomas 15 pass from Gruden (Czyzewski kick)
2nd quarter
 DET - FG Langelog 21
 TB -  FB Czyzewski 47
 TB -  Browner 0 fumble recovery (Czyzewski kick)
 DET - LaFrance 27 pass from Renfoe (Langelog kick)
 TB - Field 18 pass from Gruden (Czyzewski kick)
 DET - Goode 2 pass from Renfoe (Langelog kick)
 TB - FG Czyzewski 26
3rd quarter
 TB - Browner 9 pass from Byrd (Czyzewski kick)
 DET - Bell 34 pass from Renfroe (Langeloh kick)
4th quarter
 TB - Brown 7 pass from Gruden (Czyzewski kick)
 DET - Burse 1 run (Langeloh kick)
 TB - Barley 4 run (Czyzewski kick)

References

External links
 ArenaFan box score

007
1993 Arena Football League season
Tampa Bay Storm
Massachusetts Marauders
1993 in sports in Michigan
American football competitions in Detroit
1993 in American television
August 1993 sports events in the United States
1993 in Detroit